Dichromodes obtusata is a species of moth of the  family Geometridae. It is known from Australia.

References

Oenochrominae
Moths described in 1861